Nizhny Lyp is a rural locality (a selo) in Polozovoskoye Rural Settlement, Bolshesosnovsky District, Perm Krai, Russia. The population was 315 as of 2010. There are 6 streets.

Geography 
Nizhny Lyp is located 54 km southwest of Bolshaya Sosnova (the district's administrative centre) by road. Kozhino is the nearest rural locality.

References 

Rural localities in Bolshesosnovsky District